Harry Boland (27 April 1887 – 1 August 1922) was an Irish republican politician who served as President of the Irish Republican Brotherhood from 1919 to 1920. He served as a Teachta Dála (TD) from 1918 to 1922.

He was elected at the 1918 general election as the MP for Roscommon South, but as with other Sinn Féin candidates, he did not take seat in the British House of Commons, serving instead as a TD in the First Dáil.

At the 1921 general election, Boland was elected to the second Dáil as one of the TDs for the Mayo South–Roscommon South. He was re-elected in 1922 as an Anti-Treaty candidate, but died two months later in the Irish Civil War.

Early life
Boland was born at 6 Dalymount Terrace, Phibsborough, Dublin, on 27 April 1887, the son of Irish Republican Brotherhood member James Boland and Kate Woods. He was active in GAA circles in early life, and refereed the 1914 All-Ireland Senior Football Championship Final. He joined the IRB at the same time as his older brother Gerry in 1904, following in the footsteps of his father, uncle and probably grandfather. He was educated at the Synge Street CBS, but had a personality clash with one of the brothers so he refused to carry on his attendance at the school. He then went to De la Salle College, County Laois, as a novice.

Irish nationalism
Boland later joined the Irish Volunteers along with Gerry and his younger brother Ned. They took an active part in the Easter Rising of 1916.

At the 1918 general election, Boland was elected as an MP for the Roscommon South seat. In line with all the Sinn Féin MPs elected at that election, he did not represent his constituents at Westminster, but withdrew to sit in the declared independent Dáil Éireann (the First Dáil) and was named by Éamon de Valera as special envoy to the United States, a role his uncle Jack had played 25 years previously. He left Ireland for the United States of America along with de Valera as part of a campaign to raise awareness and support for their cause in America. Boland negotiated a loan of $20,000 from the Irish Republic to the Soviet Republic through the head of the Soviet Bureau, Ludwig Martens, using some Russian jewellery as collateral. These jewels were transferred to Ireland when he returned.

During the Irish War of Independence, Boland operated alongside Michael Collins, who was a close friend.

Civil War
Boland opposed the Anglo-Irish Treaty. In the ensuing Irish Civil War, he sided with the Anti-Treaty IRA. In the 1922 general election, he was re-elected to the Dáil representing Mayo South–Roscommon South. Six weeks later, on 31 July, Boland was shot by soldiers of the National Army when they attempted to arrest him at the Skerries Grand Hotel. Two officers entered his room and Boland, unarmed, was shot and mortally wounded during a struggle:

He died the next day in St. Vincent's Hospital on 1 August 1922. As he lay dying, he refused to give the name of his attacker to his sister, Kathleen.<ref name="Mackay">p272, James Mackay, Michael Collins: A Life;</ref>

He was buried at Glasnevin Cemetery. The service took place from the Whitefriar Street Carmelite Church. The hearse was followed by Cumann na mBan, Clan na Gael and the Citizen Army women's section.

Boland's death affected Collins. It may also may have spurred him towards peace negotiations with De Valera.

Family
Boland's brother, Gerald Boland, was a prominent member of Fianna Fáil and later served as Minister for Justice. His nephew, Kevin Boland, served as a Minister until he resigned in solidarity with the two ministers, Charles Haughey and Neil Blaney, who were sacked from the government in May 1970 during the Arms Crisis. Kevin Boland's resignation from Fianna Fáil and the subsequent loss of his seat marked the end of an era for the Boland political dynasty.

His nephew, Harry Boland, was a basketball player who competed in the 1948 Summer Olympics in London. He died on 18 December 2013, at the age of 88.

He also had a sister, Kathleen, who was entrusted, with her mother, with the safekeeping of jewels received from Russian diplomats as collateral for a loan made by the provisional government to the new Russian state in April 1920.

In popular culture
In the 1991 TV movie The Treaty, Boland was portrayed by Malcolm Douglas.

In the 1996 film Michael Collins, Boland was portrayed by Irish-American actor Aidan Quinn. The film was criticised for fictionalising both Boland's death and Collins' life.

See also
Families in the Oireachtas

Biographies
 Brasier, Andrew and Kelly, John, Harry Boland:  A Man Divided, (Dublin 2000)
 Fitzpatrick, David Harry Boland's Irish Revolution, (Cork 2003)
 Maher, Jim Harry Boland: A Biography'', (Cork 1998)

Sources
Ancient Order of Hibernians – Biography
Contemporary account of Harry Boland's death – New York Times, 2 August 1922

References

1887 births
1922 deaths
All-Ireland Senior Football Championship Final referees
Harry
Burials at Glasnevin Cemetery
Early Sinn Féin TDs
Gaelic football referees
Irish sportsperson-politicians
Members of the 1st Dáil
Members of the 2nd Dáil
Members of the 3rd Dáil
Members of the Irish Republican Brotherhood
Members of the Parliament of the United Kingdom for County Roscommon constituencies (1801–1922)
People educated at Synge Street CBS
People from Clontarf, Dublin
People of the Irish Civil War (Anti-Treaty side)
UK MPs 1918–1922
Gaelic games players from County Dublin